James Gregory Arniel (born November 16, 1989) is a Canadian ice hockey centre who is currently playing for Kassel Huskies of the DEL2.

Arniel was drafted by the Boston Bruins in the fourth round (97th overall) of the 2008 NHL Entry Draft. He is the nephew of Scott Arniel.

Playing career
June 22 2008 after being drafted in the 4th round 97th overall by the Boston Bruins, Arniel was out celebrating and got behind the wheel of his vehicle after attending stages nightclub in his hometown of Kingston, Ontario. Arniel blew 2.5 times the legal limit and was arrested and charged with a DUI.
On November 9, 2010, the Boston Bruins recalled Arniel on an emergency basis from the AHL's Providence Bruins, and on November 28, 2010, Arniel made his NHL debut, suiting up for the Bruins in an away game against the Atlanta Thrashers. He was awarded a Stanley Cup Ring and included on team picture for his play. However, Arniel did not qualify to have name engraved on the Stanley Cup (41 regular season game, or 1 game in the finals).

On August 20, 2012, Arniel signed in Europe to a one-year contract with Eisbären Berlin of the German DEL. In his second European season, Arniel transferred from Lukko Rauma of the Finnish Liiga, to Dornbirner EC of the Austrian EBEL.

Having joined the Vienna Capitals for the 2018–19 season, Arniel continued in the EBEL scoring 11 points through 19 games. On February 14, 2019, Arniel was mutually released from his contract in returning to the DEL in joining Augsburger Panther for the remainder of the campaign.

Arniel returned to the EBEL the following summer, signing a one-year deal with Italian outfit, HC Bolzano, on August 2, 2019.

Career statistics

References

External links

1989 births
Living people
Augsburger Panther players
Bolzano HC players
Boston Bruins draft picks
Boston Bruins players
Canadian ice hockey centres
Dornbirn Bulldogs players
Eisbären Berlin players
Guelph Storm players
Ice hockey people from Ontario
Sportspeople from Kingston, Ontario
Lukko players
Providence Bruins players
Sarnia Sting players
Vienna Capitals players
Canadian expatriate ice hockey players in Austria
Canadian expatriate ice hockey players in Finland
Canadian expatriate ice hockey players in Germany
Bratislava Capitals players
HK Poprad players
Kassel Huskies players
Canadian expatriate ice hockey players in Italy
Canadian expatriate ice hockey players in Slovakia